FC Sasco Tbilisi is a Georgian football club.

History
The club was founded in 2005 on the base of FC Norchi Dinamoeli. The most popular players were Davit Skhirtladze and Giorgi Kvilitaia. The team owner was Gia Sichinava. The club colours were red/black.

Honours
 -Erovnuli Liga 2-2010

References

Football clubs in Georgia (country)